Mimusops is a genus of plants in the family Sapotaceae described as a genus by Linnaeus in 1753.

Mimusops is native to tropical and subtropical regions of Asia, Africa, Australia, and various oceanic islands.

There are about 57 species.

Species

References

 
Sapotaceae genera
Taxa named by Carl Linnaeus
Taxonomy articles created by Polbot